The following highways are numbered 841:

United States